Louis Campbell (born April 1, 1979) is an American professional basketball player, who lastly played for Antibes Sharks of the LNB Pro A.

Professional career
After playing college basketball with Buffalo Bulls, he played most of his career in Germany with Paderborn Baskets, Gießen 46ers, Eisbären Bremerhaven, EWE Baskets Oldenburg and  Walter Tigers Tübingen. He also played three seasons in Japan with Toyota Alvark, and had short stint with Ciudad de Huelva in Spain. From August 2012, he played with Strasbourg IG. He was named the 2014–15 French Basketball Cup MVP, after Strasbourg won the Cup.

References

External links
 Eurobasket.com Profile
 Euroleague.net Profile

1979 births
Living people
African-American basketball players
Alvark Tokyo players
American expatriate basketball people in France
American expatriate basketball people in Germany
American expatriate basketball people in Japan
American expatriate basketball people in Spain
American men's basketball players
Buffalo Bulls men's basketball players
Eisbären Bremerhaven players
EWE Baskets Oldenburg players
Fos Provence Basket players
Giessen 46ers players
Olympique Antibes basketball players
Paderborn Baskets players
Metropolitans 92 players
Point guards
Rahway High School alumni
Shooting guards
SIG Basket players
Sportspeople from Rahway, New Jersey
Tigers Tübingen players
21st-century African-American sportspeople
20th-century African-American sportspeople